The following is a timeline of the history of the Chinese city of Guangzhou, also formerly known as Panyu, Canton, and Kwang-chow.

Nanyue

 214 BCE – Panyu established as a Qin base during Zhao Tuo's first failed invasion of the southern lands of the Baiyue 
 204 BCE – Panyu becomes the capital of Zhao Tuo's kingdom of Nanyue.

Imperial China

 111 BCE – Panyu becomes a provincial capital of the Han Dynasty after the Han–Nanyue War as the Han expands southward.
 226 CE – Panyu becomes the seat of Guang Prefecture ("Guangzhou").
 401 – Guangxiao Temple first established as the "Baoen Guangziao" Temple.
 537 – Temple of the Six Banyan Trees built.
 878–879 — Guangzhou massacre instigated by forces loyal to Huang Chao
 1350 – Huaisheng Mosque rebuilt.
 1380 – Zhenhai Tower built.
 1516 – Portuguese merchants arrive.

 1600 – Pazhou Pagoda built.
 1619 – Chigang Pagoda built.
 1684 – British East India Company in business.

 1821 – Xigutang literary society formed.
 1822 - Fire.
 1827 – The Canton Register, an English-language newspaper, begins publication.
 1832 – Jardine, Matheson and Co. in business.
 1834 – Wetmore & Co. in business.
 1835 – The Canton Press, an English-language newspaper, begins publication.
 1840 – Augustine Heard and Company in business.
 1841
 February 27: Battle of First Bar.
 March 2: Battle of Whampoa.
 March 18: Battle of Canton
 May: Second Battle of Canton.
 1842 – City designated a treaty port under the Treaty of Nanking.
 1848 – Apostolic Vicariate of Guangdong-Guangxi established.
 1856
 British/French occupation begins.
 Thirteen Factories set on fire.
 1859 – Shameen Island divided into French and British concessions.
 1861 – British/French occupation ends.
 1863 – Sacred Heart Cathedral built.
 1866 – Yu Yin Shan Fang garden laid out.
 1879
 City area: 6.5 square kilometers (approximate).
 Population: 400,000 (estimate).
 1894
 Plague (3rd Pandemic).
 Chen Clan Academy built.
 1895 – First Guangzhou uprising
 1908 – Guangzhou North Railway Station opens.
 1911
 Kowloon–Canton Railway begins operating.
 Second Guangzhou Uprising

Republic of China
 The Shakee Massacre on June 23, 1925 resulted in over two hundred casualties due to gunfire by British, French and Portuguese forces in Shaji (called Shake in Cantonese)
 1918 – Urban council established.
 1923
 June: National Congress of the Chinese Communist Party held in Guangzhou.
 Kuomintang in power.
 1924
 Peasant Movement Training Institute and Whampoa Military Academy open.
 Canton Merchant Volunteers Corps Uprising.
 National Kwangtung University established.
 1927 – December 11–13: Communist uprising.
 1931 – Sun Yat-sen Memorial Hall built.
 1932
 Guangzhou Baiyun Airport opens in Baiyun District.
 Guangzhou Conservatory of Music founded.
 1933 – Haizhu Bridge constructed.
 1936
 Canton–Hankou Railway begins operating.
 Population: 1,122,600 (estimate).
 1938 – October 21: Japanese occupation begins.
 1945 – September 16: Japanese occupation ends.
 1949
 Nationalist government under the acting president Li Zongren relocates to Guangzhou.
 Nanfang Daily newspaper begins publication.

People's Republic of China

 1949
 October: Communist forces enter city.
 Radio Guangdong begins broadcasting.
 1952 – Guangzhou Daily newspaper begins publication.
 1954
 Guangzhou Evergrande Football Club formed.
 South China Institute of Botany active.
 1956 – Guangzhou University of Chinese Medicine founded.
 1957
 Beijing–Guangzhou Railway in operation.
 Canton Fair begins.
 Guangzhou Symphony Orchestra founded.
 Population: 1,840,000.
 1958
 Guangzhou Academy of Fine Arts in operation.
 Jinan University relocates to Guangzhou.
 1959 – Guangdong Provincial Museum founded.
 1964 – Population: 3,031,486.
 1967 – Renmin Bridge built.
 1981 - Sister city relationship established with Los Angeles, USA.
 1982
 Guangzhou Library and Liyuan Poetry Society established.
 Population: 3,181,510 city; 5,669,640 urban agglomeration.
 1983 – Mausoleum of the Nanyue King discovered.
 1984
 Guangzhou Economic and Technological Development Zone established.
 City designated sub-provincial city administrative status.
 Southern Weekly newspaper begins publication.
 1985
 Zhujiang Brewery begins operation.
 Guangzhou Bridge built.
 1988
 Haiyin Bridge built.
 Museum of the Mausoleum of the Nanyue King opens.
 1990
 Guangdong International Building constructed.
 Avon begins hiring ladies in Guangzhou.
 Population: 6,299,943.
 1991
 Guangzhou TV Tower erected.
 November: 1991 FIFA Women's World Cup held.
 1992 – Guangzhou Free Trade Zone established.
 1996 – Guangzhou East railway station opens.
 1997
 Guangzhou Metro begins operating.
 CITIC Plaza and Humen Pearl River Bridge built.
 Southern Metropolis Daily begins publication.
 Xiangjiang Safari Park opens.
 1998 – Hedong Bridge, Jiangwan Bridge, Jiefang Bridge, and Huanan Bridge open.
 2000 – Yajisha Bridge opens.
 2001
 Guangdong Olympic Stadium opens.
 November: Chinese National Games held in Guangzhou.
 2002
 Vitamin Creative Space founded.
 Population: 10,106,229.
 2003
 Zhang Guangning becomes mayor.
 Pazhou Bridge opens.
 2004
 Guangzhou Baiyun International Airport opens in Huadu District.
 Guangzhou Higher Education Mega Center built.
 Guangzhou International Women's Open tennis tournament begins.
 2006 – Chime-Long Paradise amusement park in business.
 2008 – Huangpu Bridge and Xinguang Bridge open.
 2009 – Liede Bridge opens.
 2010
 Canton Tower and Guangzhou International Finance Center built.
 November: 2010 Asian Games held.
 Guangzhou Opera House, Guangdong Museum, and Guangzhou South Railway Station open.
 Wan Qingliang becomes mayor.
 Guangzhou Television Cantonese controversy.
 Guangzhou Bus Rapid Transit system launched.
 2011
 Guangzhou–Zhuhai Intercity Railway begins operating.
 Pearl River Tower built.
 Chen Jianhua becomes mayor.
 2012 – Leatop Plaza and The Pinnacle built.
 2013 - Air pollution in Guangzhou reaches annual mean of 48 PM2.5 and 72 PM10, more than recommended.
 2021 - 2021 Guangzhou bombing.

See also
 Guangzhou history
 List of administrative divisions of Guangzhou
 Mayor of Guangzhou
 List of newspapers in Guangdong
 List of universities and colleges in Guangzhou
 List of historic buildings in Guangzhou
 List of tallest buildings in Guangzhou (sortable by date)
 Eight Sights of Guangzhou
 Major National Historical and Cultural Sites (Guangdong) in Guangzhou
 Southward expansion of the Han Dynasty
 Other names of Guangzhou
 Urbanization in China

Notes

References

 .
 
 .
 .
 
 .
 .

 
 
 
 
 
 .
 
 
 .

Attribution
This article incorporates information from the Chinese Wikipedia, Dutch Wikipedia, and the Japanese Wikipedia.

External links

 Items related to Guangzhou and Canton, various dates (via Europeana). 
 
 Items related to Guangzhou and Canton, China, various dates (via Digital Public Library of America).

guangzhou

guangzhou
guangzhou